Jasvir Singh (born 4 April 1984) is an Indian professional Kabaddi player. He was a member of the India national kabaddi team that won Asian Games Gold medal in 2014 and World Cup in 2016. He hails from Panipat and serves in the Oil and Natural Gas Corporation (ONGC). He  serves as fire safety officer.

Early life 
He was born on 4 April 1984 in Panipat, Haryana, India.

Pro Kabaddi League
He played for Jaipur Pink Panthers in the Pro Kabaddi League in season 5. In season 6, he played for Tamil Thalaivas.

World Cup 2016 and Awards 
Jasvir Singh was a member of the gold medal-winning team at the 2016 Kabaddi World Cup. He awarded the Arjuna award in 2017 For his excellence in the game of Kabbadi.

References 

1984 births
Living people
Indian kabaddi players
Asian Games medalists in kabaddi
Asian Games gold medalists for India
Medalists at the 2014 Asian Games
Kabaddi players at the 2014 Asian Games
Kabaddi players from Haryana
People from Panipat district
Recipients of the Arjuna Award